The Mercurius Gallobelgicus was an early printed periodical, published semi-annually, and written in Latin. It first appeared in 1592 in Cologne, Germany, compiled by the Dutch Catholic refugee Michael ab Isselt, under the pseudonym "D. M. Jansonius". It was distributed widely, even finding its way to readers in England.

After Isselt's death, rival continuations were printed in Cologne and Frankfurt. The Frankfurt Mercurii Gallobelgici succenturiati was compiled by Gotthard Arthusius from 1603 to 1626, then briefly by Georg Beatus, and from 1628 by Johann Philipp Abelin. The Cologne continuation, under the title Annalium Mercurio Gallobelgico succenturiatorum, was the work of Gaspar Ens. It was last published in 1635.

External links
 September 1592 edition on Google Books.
 March 1594 edition on Google Books.
 Autumn 1603 edition of the Frankfurt continuation, on Google Books.

References

Biannual magazines published in Germany
Defunct magazines published in Germany
History of printing
Latin-language newspapers
Magazines established in 1592
Magazines disestablished in 1635
Mass media in Cologne